Zapolitsy is a rural locality (a selo) in Pavlovskoye Rural Settlement, Suzdalsky District, Vladimir Oblast, Russia. The population was 21 as of 2010. There are 7 streets.

Geography 
Zapolitsy is located on the right bank of the Nerl River, 31 km southeast of Suzdal (the district's administrative centre) by road. Burakovo is the nearest rural locality.

References 

Rural localities in Suzdalsky District